Mary-Anne Thomas (born 26 February 1963) is an Australian politician. She has been a Labor Party member of the Victorian Legislative Assembly since November 2014, representing the electorate of Macedon. She has served as Victoria's Minister for Health and Minister for Ambulance Services since June 2022. She was previously the Agriculture and Minister for Regional Development from December 2020.

Education and early career 

Thomas studied at Wodonga High School, and completed a teaching degree at the Melbourne College of Advanced Education. She holds a Graduate Diploma in Industrial Relations from Victoria University and a Masters of Public Policy from the University of Melbourne.

She worked for 25 years across public, private and community sectors. She began her career as a secondary teacher, then worked in the union movement before becoming an advisor to Lynne Kosky, the Minister for Post-Compulsory Education, Employment and Training. She has also held roles in the Victorian public service in Education, and the Department of Premier and Cabinet, where she was Head of Communications.

Prior to entering Parliament, she held senior roles at the National Australia Bank and Plan International, one of the world's leading child rights and international development agencies.

Political career 
Thomas was elected to the Victorian Legislative Assembly as the Member for Macedon in November 2014. She had previously contested Labor pre-selection for the Federal seat of Batman, but lost to then Senator David Feeney.

She was appointed Minister for Agriculture and Minister for Regional Development in the Andrews Labor Government in December 2020, having previously served as the Parliamentary Secretary for Health & Carers. In June 2022, she was appointed as Minister for Health and Minister for Ambulance Services.

References

External links
 Parliamentary voting record of Mary-Anne Thomas at Victorian Parliament Tracker

1963 births
Living people
Australian Labor Party members of the Parliament of Victoria
Members of the Victorian Legislative Assembly
21st-century Australian politicians
Women members of the Victorian Legislative Assembly
21st-century Australian women politicians
Victorian Ministers for Agriculture